Lemitar is a census-designated place in Socorro County, New Mexico, United States. Its population was 330 as of the 2010 census. Lemitar has a post office with ZIP code 87823. Exit 156 on Interstate 25 serves the community.

Geography

Demographics

Education
It is within Socorro Consolidated Schools. Socorro High School is the comprehensive high school of the district.

References

Census-designated places in New Mexico
Census-designated places in Socorro County, New Mexico